The Jericho Diamond Mine is a dormant diamond mine located in Canada's Nunavut territory. Jericho is Nunavut’s first and only diamond mine.

On July 19, 2010 Shear Diamonds (née Shear Minerals Ltd), a diamond exploration company focused on the Nunavut region, announced its purchase of the Jericho Diamond Mine. In late 2010, Shear announced that it would take about a year to devise a plan to reopen the mine. Shear began processing the existing recovery reject pile in early 2012, selling the recovered stones to Belgian diamond firm Taché, which provided a revolving line of credit.  However, operations were suspended in September, as Shear, citing "limited funds and significant operations", has sought to minimize expenditures.  Taché has given notice of default on certain covenants of their investment agreement, but is working with Shear to find funding or a purchaser.

Operations
The mine was developed, opened and operated by Tahera Diamond Corporation. The company was provided with CAN $35 million loan by Tiffany & Co. to assist in construction of the site, as part of a marketing alliance. The mine produced diamonds from 2006 to February 2008, and was Tahera's only mining operation. The company reported financial losses in 2007 due to operational difficulties, the high value of the Canadian dollar, high oil prices, and the short operating season of the Tibbitt to Contwoyto ice road in 2006. Tahera filed for protection from creditors in January 2008, and the mine stopped recovering diamonds once existing ore stockpiles ran out, one month later.

There is no registered airport at the site, so all heavy equipment had to be brought in by the Tibbitt-to-Contwoyto winter road. Due to the remoteness of the site, the mine was part of the impetus for a proposal to build a port near the community of Bathurst Inlet with a road to both the Diavik Diamond Mine and the Ekati Diamond Mine.

Production
The mine was estimated to be able to produce  a year with a value of CAN $25 million.

See also
 Jericho pipe

Notes and references

External links 
 Shear Diamonds
 Tahera Diamond Corporation - Jericho exploration
 Tahera Diamond Corporation - Jericho Diamond Mine
 Government of Canada - backgrounder on "Mining in the North"
 CBC report on construction of the mine
 NNSL "Opportunities North" - deep water port at Bathurst Inlet
 Tache Alliance - diamond and jewellery company

Diamond mines in Canada
Mines in Nunavut
Buildings and structures in Nunavut
Kitikmeot Region
2008 establishments in Nunavut